Vilayati Ram Katyal (29 July 1935 – 8 April 1988) was an Indian politician and former member of Uttar Pradesh Legislative Assembly. Katyal was assassinated on 8 April 1988.

References

1935 births
1988 deaths
Indian National Congress politicians from Uttar Pradesh
Uttar Pradesh MLAs 1980–1985
Uttar Pradesh MLAs 1985–1989